Speirantha is a genus of one known species of flowering plants found  in south-east China. In the APG III classification system, it is placed in the family Asparagaceae, subfamily Nolinoideae (formerly the family Ruscaceae).

The sole species is Speirantha gardenii, endemic to China (provinces of Anhui, Jiangsu, Jiangxi, and Zhejiang).

Etymology
Speirantha is derived from Greek and means 'twisted flower' (spiral + anther).

Taxonomy
The species now called Speirantha gardenii was first described by William Jackson Hooker in 1855 as Albuca gardenii. Separately, in 1875, John Gilbert Baker described Speirantha convallarioides, based on a different type, placing it in his new genus Speirantha. In 1894, Louis Antoine François Baillon synonymized Albuca gardenii and Speirantha convallarioides. The older epithet gardenii has priority, so the correct name is Speirantha gardenii. The type of the genus Speirantha remains the type of Speirantha convallarioides.

References

Monotypic Asparagaceae genera
Nolinoideae
Endemic flora of China
Taxa named by Henri Ernest Baillon
Taxa named by William Jackson Hooker
Taxa named by John Gilbert Baker